Verkhnebeloye is a rural locality (a selo) and the administrative center of Verkhnebelovsky Selsoviet of Romnensky District, Amur Oblast, Russia. The population was 261 as of 2018. There are 5 streets.

Geography 
Verkhnebeloye is located on the left bank of the Belaya River, 34 km southwest of Romny (the district's administrative centre) by road. Pozdeyevka is the nearest rural locality.

References 

Rural localities in Romnensky District